Chester Lawrence Kehn (October 30, 1921 – April 5, 1984) was a Major League Baseball pitcher who played for the Brooklyn Dodgers in 1942. At 20 years of age, he was the fourth-youngest player to appear in a National League game that season.

Kehn is one of many ballplayers who only appeared in the major leagues during World War II. He made his major league debut on April 30, 1942 as a starting pitcher against the Cincinnati Reds at Crosley Field. The Dodgers won 11–8, but Kehn was not the winning pitcher. He made only two more appearances, both in relief, before his big league career was over due to a shoulder separation.  In three games he was 0–0 with 2 games finished, and allowed 6 earned runs in 7.2 innings pitched for a final ERA of 7.04.

Kehn proved to be a better hitter and fielder than he was as a pitcher, at least at the major league level. At the plate he was 2-for-2 (1.000) with one RBI and one run scored, and in the field he handled four chances without an error (1.000).

Kehn retired from baseball in 1950 after several years in Santa Barbara as their manager and had a very successful career in retail management.

Kehn died in his hometown of San Diego, California, at the age of 62.

References

External links

Major League Baseball pitchers
Baseball players from San Diego
Brooklyn Dodgers players
1921 births
1984 deaths
Minor league baseball managers
Dayton Wings players
Elmira Pioneers players
Montreal Royals players
Santa Barbara Dodgers players
Hollywood Stars players
Pueblo Dodgers players
St. Paul Saints (AA) players